141 (one hundred [and] forty-one) is the natural number following 140 and preceding 142.

In mathematics
141 is:
a centered pentagonal number.
the sum of the sums of the divisors of the first 13 positive integers.
the second n to give a prime Cullen number (of the form n2n + 1).
an undulating number in base 10, with the previous being 131, and the next being 151.
the sixth hendecagonal (11-gonal) number.
a semiprime: a product of two prime numbers, namely 3 and 47. Since those prime factors are Gaussian primes, this means that 141 is a Blum integer.
 a Hilbert prime

In the military
 The Lockheed C-141 Starlifter was a United States Air Force military strategic airlifter
 K-141 Kursk was a Russian nuclear cruise missile submarine, which sank in the Barents Sea on 12 August 2000
  was a United States Navy  ship during World War II
  was a United States Navy  during World War II
  was a United States Navy  during World War II
  was a United States Navy  following World War I
  was a United States Navy  during World War II

In transportation
 London Buses route 141 is a Transport for London contracted bus route in London
 141 Nottingham–Sutton-in-Ashfield is a bus route in England
 The 141 C Ouest was a 2-8-2 steam locomotive of the Chemin de fer de l'État
 British Rail Class 141 was the first production model of the Pacer diesel multiple units
 Union des Transports Africains de Guinée Flight 141, which crashed in the Bight of Benin on December 25, 2003
 The Saipa 141 car produced by SAIPA
 The Córas Iompair Éireann 141 class locomotive from General Motors Electro-Motive Division in 1962

In other fields
141 is also:
 The year AD 141 or 141 BC
 141 AH is a year in the Islamic calendar that corresponds to 759 – 760 CE
 141 Lumen is a dark C-type, rocky asteroid orbiting in the asteroid belt
 The atomic number of unquadunium, a temporary chemical element
 The telephone dialing prefix for withholding one's Caller ID in the United Kingdom
 Psalm 141
 Sonnet 141 by William Shakespeare

See also
 List of highways numbered 141
 United Nations Security Council Resolution 141
 United States Supreme Court cases, Volume 141

References

Integers